Chen Jiongming (18 January 187822 September 1933), courtesy name Jingcun (竞存/競存), nickname Ayan (阿烟/阿煙), was a Chinese Lawyer, military general, revolutionary, and politician who was best known as a Hailufeng Hokkien revolutionary figure in the early period of the Republic of China.

Early life
Chen Jiongming was born in 1878 at Haifeng, Guangdong, China as Chen Jie. He was born into a landlord family of moderate wealth and sent to study the Confucian classics in a private school by his grandfather at the age of 5, having been raised by him since his father died in 1881. His grandfather died in 1882, leaving the Chen family with declining wealth. He received the literary degree of Xiucai in 1899, adopting the name Jiongming ("To Illuminate Brightly"), and later the courtesy name Jingcun ("To Compete for Survival"). 

He married Huang Yun, the daughter of the principal of the school he attended, birthing eight children, five of which were daughters - Buoyao, Biyao, Ruiyao, Shuyao, and Weiyao, and three of which were sons: Dingxia, Dingyan, and Dingbing. In 1904, Chen attended the Haifeng Normal School to train to become a schoolteacher, graduating and applying for a teaching position at the advanced primary school in Haifeng in 1905. He was initially supposed to be the principal, but was banned from joining for his revolutionary ideas. He occasionally went to Huizhou to tutor wealthy students for the district examination. In early 1906, he tried to create a private normal school for training teachers. When that plan failed, he attended the Academy of Law and Political Science in Guangzhou and graduated in August 1908.

Early revolutionary
During his time at the Academy of Law and Political Science, Chen and his friends often used their vacations to return to Haifeng and promote their Self-Government Association (Zizhihui), trying to eradicate opium smoking, improving local grain depots, and creating nurseries for children.

As the East River region was becoming more disorderly, the Governor-General (Zongdu) in Guangzhou gave the magistrate in Huizhou the power to execute prisoners without trial at the scene of the crime, leading to the arrest and execution of everyone in sight when the magistrate heard of a disturbance, once arresting a 13-year-old boy, of which his release was appealed successfully, but to no avail as the villagers discovered he had been executed the day before the appeal went through. Due to this misconduct, the local gentry pleaded to remove the magistrate, but the position of lead petitioner was not taken up by anyone initially, due to the risk of execution if the Governor-General proved the accusations to be false. Therefore, Chen was asked to take up the position for a reward of 1000 US Dollars. He replied, saying that he would first look into the matter himself. He collected evidence and interviewed witnesses, and went to Guangzhou to confront the Governor-General, successfully defending the petition and impeaching the magistrate, later donating his monetary reward at the Huizhou Fraternal Association in Guangzhou, explaining that he would not have done it for money as he was a citizen from the East River region. Thus, Chen gained a reputation for his leadership and his refusal to benefit financially in Guangzhou.

During his vacation from the Academy in February 1908, at the shrine to Wen Tianxiang in Haifeng, Chen persuaded over 30 men to swear their support for the National Revolution. Many of them (also named Chen, but not related) stayed his acolytes throughout his political career. Chen's new group was made up of "village intellectuals". None of them were foreign-educated or members of secret societies. For this group, revolution was not a means to an end to the Manchu, but to the daily suffering and injustice they experienced.

Chen Jiongming returned home from the Academy in 1908, establishing the Haifeng Self-Government Gazette (Haifeng Zizhibao) in early 1909, where he was the editor-in-chief. Before Chen's gazette, the people of Haifeng were already readers of revolutionary literature. According to Chen Qiyou, "Secret revolutionary literature, such as Zou Rong's The Revolutionary Army, was read widely among young intellectuals".

Guangdong Provincial Assembly
In 1909, 94 members were elected to the Guangdong Provincial Assembly, three of which represented Manchu bannermen. The number of assemblymen from each prefecture varied greatly - there were only 36 for Guangzhou Fu and only 6 for Huizhou Fu. The minimum age to join was 30, and Chen Jiongming, who was barely above the limit, was one of the people elected to the assembly to represent Huizhou.

The first annual session of the Guangdong Provincial Assembly was called on October 14, 1909, but delayed by 10 days. Chen Jiongming was elected Resident Member by 53 votes. Chen Jiongming was one of the only progressives in the conservative-dominated assembly. He was elected to chair the Committee of Legal Matters. Chen introduced 6 of the 25 bills the Assembly passed during its first session. He submitted a proposal about gambling, stating in his speech that:

Chen also supported a bill to expropriate funds from family and clan estates. However, when the matter was left to the gentry to decide, Chen protested, saying that from experience, the gentry would do nothing, and some sort of government intervention would be preferred. In the third meeting, Chen proposed a bill to abolish the Bureau of Rehabilitation, which was passed by the Assembly but rejected by the Governor-General in Guangzhou. In the fifth meeting, Chen again spoke against gambling and, on the subject with the border dispute with Macau, urged the Assembly to petition the Governor-General to talk to Beijing and set a course to negotiate with Portugal. During the ninth meeting, Chen expressed his opinion that the Assembly should not be subordinate to the Governor-General. He also proposed the elimination of the articles in the penal code that allowed local authorities to execute criminals without trial at the scene of the crime, something he stressed greatly due to his previous experiences with the village magistrate. With only 21 votes in favor, Chen's proposal was rejected. Chen introduced a bill to inaugurate schools for girls and another that required the election of the board of directors of educational institutions, instead of being appointed by the government.

A month after the creation of the Guangdong Provincial Assembly, the Jiangsu Assembly created the Union of Provincial Assemblies to urge Beijing to accelerate the constitutional program. Three delegates from each province were sent to Shanghai, which in February 1910 went to Beijing to call for the inauguration of a national parliament within one year. Chen Jiongming was one of the delegates representing Guangdong, along with another progressive, Qiu Fengjia. Chen went to Shanghai, but not to Beijing. By then, he was already back in Guangzhou, committed to a revolutionary uprising that had been planned to begin on February 12.

First attempts at revolution
Chen Jiongming may have joined the Tongmenghui between 1906 and 1908, inspired by his Japanese-educated instructor at the Academy, Zhu Zhixin, but another source states that he joined the organization in 1909 at the meeting of the Union of Provincial Assemblies in Shanghai.

The Canton New Army, measuring around 7,000 men, had prepared a coup that was to be launched on February 12, 1910, during Chinese New Year celebrations. Zhang Lucun, a participant in secret meetings of the coup planning, recalls:

Had the coup succeeded, Chen Jiongming would have become the Deputy Chief of Guangdong, with his fellow Assemblyman Qiu Fengjia as Chief Executive. However, authorities had become aware of the coup around 3 months before it was to happen and put Canton under martial law. Chen Jiongming's village comrades and revolutionaries gathered at his house to receive arms and ammunition, but the fierce gunfight that ensued on the way to the Big East Gate killed leaders on both sides.

On February 9, when the first clashes were starting, Chen Jiongming told the revolutionaries in Haifeng to send his mother to Hong Kong for safety and to alert East River revolutionaries. After one of the leaders of the revolutionary army, Ni Yingdian, was killed in battle, Chen Jiongming secretly left to Hong Kong.

While in Hong Kong in February 1910, Chen Jiongming and 10 others organized the Chinese Assassination Corps with Liu Shifu. Chen was one of the Corps' members that were involved both in the Corp and in the Tongmenghui. All 12 members of the corps swore secrecy and comradeship.

Even though Chen Jiongming's involvement in revolutionary activities were revealed to Manchu authorities, he continued his activities as a member of the Guangdong Provincial Assembly. When Chen returned to Canton in May 1910, the Assembly was in hot debate over the Canton-Hankou Railway Company. The Assembly appointed Chen and 5 others to form a special committee to draft new by-laws by June 1. During a meeting with representatives of interested organizations on the next day, Chen reminded the members that the by-laws would have to receive shareholder approval, and that a shareholder meeting was scheduled for September. During the same Assembly session, Chen Jiongming was asked to draft an impeachment document for appointed officials.

On October 3, 1910, Chen attended the second annual Assembly session. During the session, Chen initiated the investigation for a magistrate in Haifeng. According to Huazi Ribao,

Chen was skeptical about the Assembly's plan to push for the early inauguration of the national parliament. Chen agreed with another Assemblyman that he would support the proposal only to "ride with the tide", as he was already committed to a revolution instead of reform. The Assembly also discussed Chen's anti-gambling proposals he had made at the last annual session in 1909.

Chen made a new proposal to the assembly in the second annual session, where he would revamp the salt revenue administration and use salt revenues to replace the revenue lost by gambling, filling the revenue gap. He proposed:

In order to preserve free-market competition, Chen suggested for the division of salt-producing districts in Guangdong into monopolized "selling" districts, designating a number of merchants as those who would be allowed to trade freely, and implementing regulations for salt merchants.

The Assembly once again requested the Governor-General to petition Beijing for Chen's gambling proposal, but he declined. The Assembly voted on October 17 to adjourn in protest, with telegrams explaining their position sent to authorities and prominent Cantonese in Beijing and other provincial assemblies. After 9 days, the Governor-General finally agreed to bring the issue to Beijing.

Later on, an issue started over the full suppression of gambling. Fully aware that he would lose the vote as many assemblymen were bribed by gambling companies, Chen put it to a written vote, which lost. Chen then turned this around and exposed the bribed assemblymen, with the 35 assemblymen who voted against the proposal forced to resign. Newly-appointed Governor-General Zhang Mingqi agreed to the proposal and promised to implement it on March 30, 1911. In December 1910, the assemblymen who were exposed and forced to resign from their positions started 2 newspapers, criticizing and responding to Chen. The assemblymen who voted for the proposal made a newspaper in response, known as Ke Bao (Assent), in a reference to their votes on the proposal. Its first issue appeared on March 30, 1911, on the same day the proposed changes were supposed to be implemented. However, the newspaper was quickly closed down on April 23, as authorities in Guangzhou accused content in it of being "derogatory toward the Throne and so inflammatory as to disturb the peace and tranquility of the nation".

Xinhai Revolution
On April 13, 1911, the special assembly session called by Governor-General Zhang Mingqi on March 22, 1911, was closed. General Fu Qi had been assassinated, and Guangzhou was put under martial law. The South China branch office of the Tongmenghui decided to start their uprising in Spring 1911, with a force of 800 revolutionaries. An Overall Planning Bureau was put in Hong Kong to direct the uprising. Huang Xing was made Bureau Chief, Zhao Sheng was made deputy chief, Hu Hanmin was in charge of the secretariat, and Chen Jiongming was responsible for organization. Overseas Chinese raised 190,000 Hong Kong Dollars to support the uprising.

By early 1911, Chen Jiongming was funneling his fellow revolutionaries from the East River district into Guangzhou. Chen's residence on Sihou street was their headquarters, the Siping School and the Ke Bao office were their munitions depots, Chen's quarters at the Provincial Assembly were used as an explosives depot, and Chen Dasheng's house was used as a staging point for setting fire to the Manchu quarters.

Political career
Trained as a lawyer at the Academy of Law and Political Science, he became a Qing legislator, a republican revolutionary, a military leader, a civil administrator and a federalist who sought to reconstruct China as a democratic republic. He obtained the post of commander-in-chief of the Guangdong Army. He became military governor of Guangdong Military Government three times (1911–1912, 1913, 1920–1923) and civil governor of Guangdong from 1920–1922 and military governor of Guangxi from 1921–1922.

Chen was instrumental in backing Sun Yat-sen's Constitutional Protection Movement. He also restored Sun to power after the Guangdong-Guangxi War. Chen disagreed with Sun about the direction that reform should take—Sun wanted to unite the country by force and institute change through a centralized government based on a one-party system, while Chen advocated multiparty federalism with Guangdong becoming the model province and the peaceful unification of China. Sun became suspicious that the federalist movement was being exploited by the warlords to justify their military fiefdoms.

Relations deteriorated further when Sun became "extraordinary president", a move not condoned by the Provisional Constitution. It was Chen who first invited the Chinese Communist Party to Guangdong against Sun's objection that the Communists might dilute the movement. After the First Zhili-Fengtian War in 1922 there was a strong movement to reunite the northern and southern governments by having both Sun and Xu Shichang resign their rival presidencies in favor of restoring Li Yuanhong as president of a united republic. Chen was enthusiastic but Sun felt the new government would be a powerless puppet of the Zhili clique.

Sun Yat-sen and Chen Jiongming soon split over the continuation of the Northern Expedition. Sun conceived it to have begun with the occupation of Guangxi. From there he wished Chen to push into Hunan. After Wu Peifu of the Zhili clique in Beijing recognized his power in the south, Chen abandoned Sun.  Unexpectedly revolting against the Kuomintang militarily in 1922, Chen led his forces to attack Sun's residence as well as office. Sun was forced to escape on HMS Moorhen and delay his Northern Expedition.

With the help of Tang Jiyao, the KMT retook Guangzhou in 1923. Chen fled to Huizhou in eastern Guangdong after Sun's army defeated him. From 1923–1925 the Guangdong government organized two eastern campaigns against him and he fled to Hong Kong, as his remaining forces were completely wiped out in 1925. He became an ally of Tang Jiyao, after Tang was expelled from the KMT following the Yunnan-Guangxi War. He was elected premier of the China Public Interest Party with Tang as his deputy. From Hong Kong he criticized the Nationalists' single-party system and continued to advocate multiparty federalism. After the Japanese invasion of Manchuria, he attacked Chiang Kai-shek's regime for its refusal to confront Japan and he organized boycotts of Japanese products. He died of typhus on September 22, 1933.

Legacy 
Chen has somewhat of a mixed legacy but most would agree that he contributed in some significant way to the establishment of modern China.

On one hand in some mainland and Taiwanese textbooks, Chen is considered a traitor and reactionary warlord by both the Kuomintang and the CCP for his rebellion against Sun in 1922.  Sun's party quickly began to publish propaganda about Chen to discredit him. The Communists, who had entered into an alliance with Sun and who still regard him as the founding hero of the Chinese Revolution, have continued to characterize Chen as a counter-revolutionary.

On the other hand, his party defended him as a true revolutionary and democrat by pointing out the tragedies, misgovernance and corruption caused by centralized, one-party dictatorship. After the China Public Interest Party formed a united front with the Communists in 1947, Chen's role has been obscured to the point of invisibility in the party's official history. Other than his family, his most vocal apologist was Chinese writer Li Ao.

References

Further reading 
 Chen Jiongming (with photo)
 Chen Jiongming:  Anarchism and the Federalist State
 The Zhuang and the 1911 Revolution

See also
Cantonese nationalism
Northern Expedition
Peng Pai

External links 

 Center for Chen Jiongming Studies 
 Center for Chen Jiongming Studies
 University of Michigan Press Book: Chen Jiongming and the Federalist Movement
 Finding aid to Leslie H. Dingyan Chen's collection of Historiographic Materials for a Biography of Chen Chiung-Ming, 1988, at Columbia University. Rare Book & Manuscript Library.

1878 births
1933 deaths
20th-century Chinese lawyers
China Zhi Gong Party politicians
Deaths from typhus
Governors of Guangdong
Infectious disease deaths in Hong Kong
People from Haifeng County
Politicians from Shanwei
Republic of China warlords from Guangdong
Tongmenghui members